Randy Newman is an American singer-songwriter, arranger, composer, and pianist. The following are a list of his wins and nominations for awards in music.

He has been nominated for 22 Academy Awards, winning twice – Best Original Song in 2002 for "If I Didn't Have You" from Monsters, Inc., and Best Original Song in 2011 for "We Belong Together" from Toy Story 3. He has received three Emmys, seven Grammy Awards, and the Governor's Award from the Recording Academy. Newman was inducted into the Songwriters Hall of Fame in 2002. In 2007, he was inducted as a Disney Legend. In 2010, he received a star on the Hollywood Walk of Fame. Newman was inducted to the Rock and Roll Hall of Fame in 2013. In September 2014, Randy Newman received a Max Steiner Film Music Achievement Award and performed at the annual film music gala Hollywood in Vienna for the first time together with his cousin David Newman.

Major awards

Academy Awards

British Academy Film Awards

Critics' Choice Movie Awards

Golden Globe Awards

Grammy Awards

Primetime Emmy Awards

Miscellaneous awards

Annie Awards

Austin Film Critics Association Awards

Black Reel Awards

Chicago Film Critics Association Awards

Chicago Indie Critics Awards

Columbus Film Critics Association Awards

Florida Film Critics Circle Awards

Greater Western New York Film Critics Association Awards

Hawaii Film Critics Society Awards

Hollywood Film Awards

Hollywood Music in Media Awards

Houston Film Critics Society Awards

International Cinephile Society Awards

International Film Music Critics Association Awards

Las Vegas Film Critics Society Awards

Los Angeles Film Critics Association Awards

Latino Entertainment Journalists Association Film Awards

New York Film Critics Circle Awards

North Carolina Film Critics Association Awards

North Dakota Film Society Awards

Online Film & Television Association Awards

Online Film Critics Society Awards

Phoenix Film Critics Society Awards

San Francisco Bay Area Film Critics Circle Awards

Satellite Awards

Saturn Awards

St. Louis Gateway Film Critics Association Awards

Washington D.C. Area Film Critics Association Awards

World Soundtrack Awards

Special honors

Disney Legends Awards

Hollywood Walk of Fame

Max Steiner Film Music Achievement Awards

Rock and Roll Hall of Fame

Songwriters Hall of Fame

Notes

References

Newman, Randy